Mountain West Conference Tournament or Mountain West Conference Championship may refer to:

Mountain West Conference baseball tournament, the college baseball championship tournament
Mountain West Conference Football Championship Game, the college football championship game
Mountain West Conference men's basketball tournament, the college basketball championship tournament
Mountain West Conference women's basketball tournament, the college basketball championship tournament